Mickey Anthony Dillard (born October 15, 1958) is a former American NBA player born in Hollywood, Florida.

After being selected by the Cleveland Cavaliers in the 1981 NBA Draft, Dillard played in 33 games for the team in the 1981–82 NBA season.

External links
Career stats at basketball-reference.com

1958 births
Living people
Basketball players from Florida
Cleveland Cavaliers draft picks
Cleveland Cavaliers players
Florida State Seminoles men's basketball players
Nova High School alumni
Point guards
Sportspeople from Hollywood, Florida
American men's basketball players